The Billboard Hot 100 is a chart that ranks the best-performing songs in the United States. Its data, published by Billboard magazine and compiled by Nielsen SoundScan, is based collectively on each song's weekly physical and digital sales, as well as the amount of airplay received on American radio stations and streaming on online digital music outlets.

During 2017, eleven singles reached number one on the Hot 100; a twelfth single, "Black Beatles" by Rae Sremmurd featuring Gucci Mane, began its run at number one in November 2016. Of those eleven number-one singles, six were collaborations. In total, nineteen acts topped the chart as either lead or featured artists, with twelve—Daft Punk, Migos, Lil Uzi Vert, Ed Sheeran, DJ Khaled, Quavo (as a solo act), Chance the Rapper, Luis Fonsi, Daddy Yankee, Cardi B, Post Malone, and 21 Savage—achieving their first Hot 100 number-one single. "Despacito" by Luis Fonsi and Daddy Yankee featuring Justin Bieber was the longest-running number-one of the year, leading the chart for sixteen weeks and tying the then-record for longest-running number-one single in the history of the chart; despite this, Ed Sheeran's "Shape of You" topped the Billboard Year-End Hot 100.

Ed Sheeran and Justin Bieber were the only acts to have multiple number ones, with both gaining two.

Chart history

Number-one artists

See also 
2017 in American music
List of Billboard 200 number-one albums of 2017
List of Billboard Hot 100 top 10 singles in 2017
Billboard Year-End Hot 100 singles of 2017

References 

United States Hot 100
2017
Hot 100 number-one singles